CFDV-FM (106.7 MHz, 106.7 Rewind Radio), is a Canadian radio station in Red Deer, Alberta. Owned by Jim Pattison Group, the station broadcasts a classic hits format. The station was licensed by the Canadian Radio-television and Telecommunications Commission (CRTC) in 2004 and was launched on November 6, 2005 as 106.7 The Drive with an active rock format playing a mixture of alternative and classic rock. On December 4, 2020, the station flipped to classic hits and rebranded as 106.7 Rewind Radio.

References

Former Logo

External links 
106.7 Rewind Radio

Fdv
Fdv
Fdv
Radio stations established in 2005
2005 establishments in Alberta